Michinori Iwaguro (born 10 December 1966) is a Japanese rower. He competed at the 1992 Summer Olympics and the 1996 Summer Olympics.

References

1966 births
Living people
Japanese male rowers
Olympic rowers of Japan
Rowers at the 1992 Summer Olympics
Rowers at the 1996 Summer Olympics
Place of birth missing (living people)
Asian Games medalists in rowing
Rowers at the 1990 Asian Games
Rowers at the 1994 Asian Games
Asian Games silver medalists for Japan
Medalists at the 1990 Asian Games
Medalists at the 1994 Asian Games